The Nahɂą Dehé Dene Band is a Dene First Nations band government in the Northwest Territories. The band inhabits the small community of Nahanni Butte, where 121 of its members live. The remaining 19 band members reside elsewhere.

The Nahɂą Dehé belong to the Dehcho First Nations.

References

First Nations in the Northwest Territories